Simoni Dall Croubelis   (1727–1790) was a Danish composer 

He was also known as Domingo Simoni, Dominique Simono, Dominique Simonaux and Simoni dâll Croebelis .

External links

References
This article was initially translated from the Danish Wikipedia.

Danish composers
Male composers
1727 births
1790 deaths
18th-century composers
18th-century male musicians
18th-century musicians